Nuker may refer to:
Nuker, microwave oven
Nuker, high-capacity Internet Web distribution site or topsite (warez)
A (usually malicious) program designed to disable a computer or destroy data
Nuker Team, the scientific group that studies galaxies